Sophie Auguste of Anhalt-Zerbst (9 March 1663 – 14 September 1694), was a German noblewoman member of the House of Ascania and by marriage Duchess of Saxe-Weimar.

Born in Zerbst, she was the eleventh of fourteen children born from the marriage of John VI, Prince of Anhalt-Zerbst and Sophie Augusta of Holstein-Gottorp. Of her thirteen older and younger siblings, only four survived to adulthood: Karl William, Anthony Günther, John Adolph and John Louis.

Life
In Zerbst on 11 October 1685, Sophie Auguste married Johann Ernst III, Duke of Saxe-Weimar. They had five children, of whom only two survive adulthood:
 John William, Hereditary Prince of Saxe-Weimar (Weimar, 4 June 1686 - Weimar, 14 October 1686).
 Ernest Augustus I, Duke of Saxe-Weimar (Weimar, 19 April 1688 – Eisenach, 19 January 1748), later inherited Eisenach and Jena.
 Eleonore Christiane (Weimar, 15 April 1689 – Weimar, 7 February 1690).
 Johanna Auguste (Weimar, 6 July 1690 – Weimar, 24 August 1691).
 Johanna Charlotte (Weimar, 23 November 1693 – Weimar, 2 March 1751).

Sophie Auguste died in Weimar, aged 31. She was buried in the Fürstengruft, Weimar.

References

|-

1663 births
1694 deaths
Sophie Auguste
Sophie Auguste
Duchesses of Saxe-Weimar
Daughters of monarchs